Norbert Brige (born 9 January 1964 in Angres, Pas-de-Calais) is a retired French long jumper.

His personal best jump was 8.22 metres, achieved in September 1988 in Nîmes. This ranks him eighth on the French all-time list, behind Kader Klouchi, Jacques Rousseau, Emmanuel Bangué, Ronald Servius, Mickaël Loria, Cheikh Touré and Salim Sdiri.

Achievements

References

External links

1964 births
Living people
French male long jumpers
Athletes (track and field) at the 1988 Summer Olympics
Olympic athletes of France
20th-century French people
21st-century French people